Franco Pedro Augusto Baldassarra (born 29 September 1998) is an Argentine professional footballer who plays as a midfielder for Platense.

Career
Baldassarra joined Platense from Argentinos Juniors in 2014. He made the breakthrough into Platense's first-team in April 2019, as he made the bench for a Primera B Nacional match with Temperley. His senior debut arrived in that match, with Fernando Ruiz selecting him to replace Marcelo Vega with twenty minutes left of an away draw; it was his only 2018–19 appearance. Baldassarra's first match of 2019–20 saw him make his first start in a win over Barracas Central on 29 October 2019. Baldassarra netted his first senior goal on 27 January 2021 versus Atlético de Rafaela in the semi-finals of the play-offs, which Platense went on to win.

Baldassarra made his Primera División debut on 21 February away against ex-club Argentinos Juniors.

Career statistics
.

Notes

References

External links

1998 births
Living people
People from Tres de Febrero Partido
Argentine footballers
Association football midfielders
Primera Nacional players
Argentine Primera División players
Club Atlético Platense footballers
Sportspeople from Buenos Aires Province